Ronald Francis Reid-Daly  (22 September 1928 – 9 August 2010) was a Rhodesian military officer who founded and commanded the Selous Scouts special forces unit that fought during the Rhodesian Bush War.

Career 
Reid-Daly, who was born in Salisbury, then capital of the British colony of Southern Rhodesia, entered military service in 1951, and served with the all-Rhodesian C Squadron of the 22 Special Air Service in counter-insurgency operations in the Federation of Malaya. He became a Member of the Order of the British Empire in 1963. Reid-Daly rose to the rank of regimental sergeant major in the Rhodesian Light Infantry, and was later commissioned and achieved the rank of captain. He retired from the army in 1973.

In late 1973, he was persuaded by General Peter Walls, then chief of the Rhodesian Army, to return to active duty in order to form the Selous Scouts, an elite special forces unit to combat the growing threat posed by communist guerrillas. Drawing on his Malayan experience, Lieutenant Colonel Reid-Daly built a skilled and highly professional regiment from scratch. Although the Selous Scouts achieved many of their military objectives, their unorthodox and often criminal methods created tensions within the military hierarchy. Reid-Daly had several brushes with the Rhodesian authorities.

In 1979, rumours surfaced in Salisbury that the Scouts were poaching ivory along the Zambezi valley. Reid-Daly dismissed the allegations as ridiculous. In the process of defending himself against them, Reid-Daly verbally attacked Major General John Hickman. For this he was charged with insubordination and sentenced to a reprimand. Disgusted, he resigned as the commander of the Scouts in August but continued to fight a legal battle against the judgement, proclaiming his innocence even after Rhodesia transformed into Zimbabwe Rhodesia, and only stopped doing so after he was forced to flee to South Africa in 1982.

In South Africa, Reid-Daly became commander of the Transkei Defence Force, and he was subsequently the leader of the private security firm Security Services Transkei. For the final decade of his life, he resided near Cape Town. In his retirement, he authored several books on his wartime experiences. He was survived by his two children and two grandchildren.

Publications
 with Peter Stiff

'

References

External links 
 
 

1928 births
2010 deaths
Members of the Order of the British Empire
People from Harare
Rhodesian military leaders
Rhodesian military personnel of the Bush War
Rhodesian people of British descent
Rhodesian Special Air Service personnel
Selous Scouts personnel
Southern Rhodesian military personnel of the Malayan Emergency
White Rhodesian people
White Zimbabwean people
Zimbabwean emigrants to South Africa